The following is a list of people from Cowley County, Kansas.  Inclusion on the list should be reserved for notable people past and present who have resided in the county, either in cities or rural areas.

The arts
 Darren E. Burrows, actor
 Terry C. Johnston, author
 Brad Long, actor who played "Buddy" #5 in the film Hoosiers
 Nila Mack, former Director of Children's Programs for CBS
 Billy Mize, musician
 Susie Owens, Playboy Playmate
 Eugene Pallette, silent film actor
 Jim "Motorhead" Sherwood, musician
 Sara Sothern, stage actress
 Gordon Young, composer

Athletics
See also List of Southwestern Moundbuilders head football coaches
 Ferrell Anderson, Major League Baseball catcher
 Vic Baltzell, linebacker for the Boston Redskins in 1935
 Bob Brannum, professional basketball player
 Charles E. Burr, jockey
 Harold Corbin, 1932 Summer Olympics fencer
 Darren Daulton, Major League Baseball catcher
 Ira Davenport, US Olympic Athlete, 1912
 Dennis Franchione, college football coach
 Jim Helmer, elected to the NAIA Coaches Hall of Fame in 2001
 Lionel Hollins, NBA basketball coach
 Art Kahler, only person to coach at two different major colleges at the same time: head basketball coach at Brown University and football coach at Dickinson College in Carlisle, Pennsylvania
 Jerry Kill, current head football coach for University of Minnesota
 Mike Kirkland, women's track coach; undefeated at the conference level since named head coach in 1992
 Dick Metz, professional golfer
 Les Miller, American football player
 Jack Mitchell, college football coach
 Bennie Owen, college football coach
 Clare Patterson, Major League Baseball outfielder
 Steve Sidwell, American football player

Celebrity
 Francis Lenn Taylor, father of Elizabeth Taylor

Military
 General Dean C. Strother, Commander in Chief, Continental Air Defense Command

Politics
 Tom Bolack, 20th Governor of New Mexico
 Robert Docking, 38th Governor of Kansas
 Greta Goodwin, Kansas politician
 Delano Lewis, former US Ambassador to South Africa
 George Thomas McDermott, US federal judge
 Betty Roberts, Associate Justice of the Oregon Supreme Court

Religion
 Bruce P. Blake, Bishop of the United Methodist Church

Science
 Robert A. Alberty, biophysical chemist

Fictional
 Mary Ann Summers, traveler on a "three-hour tour" who was lost at sea on Gilligan's Island

See also

 Lists of people from Kansas

References

Cowley County